Rajdeep Goala (born 10 May 1984)
is an Indian politician. He served as the former MLA of Assam from Lakhipur in 2014 and 2016 representing INC. Later, Rajdeep Goala joined BJP.

Education
Rajdeep did his graduation in B.Com.(P) Delhi College of Arts and Commerce  from Delhi University 2006. After that he did Post Graduate Diploma in Economics & Finance from Nottingham Business School, Nottingham Trent University United Kingdom in year 2008.

References 

Assam politicians
Living people
1984 births
Bharatiya Janata Party politicians from Assam
Assam MLAs 2011–2016
Assam MLAs 2016–2021
Alumni of Nottingham Trent University